Solanum xanti, known commonly as chaparral nightshade, purple nightshade, and San Diego nightshade, is a member of the genus Solanum. It is native to the Western United States in Arizona, California, Nevada, and Oregon, and to northwest Mexico in Baja California.

The plant grows in chaparral, oak woodlands, conifer forests, desert Madrean Sky Islands, and other habitats.

Description
The leaves are up to 7 centimeters long and are lance-shaped to oval, mostly unlobed except for occasional lobes at the bases of the blades.

It flowers from February to June in the wild, bearing an umbel-shaped inflorescence with many purple-blue flowers up to 3 centimeters wide. The fruit is a green berry 1 to 1.5 centimeters wide.

Varieties
Varieties of the species include:
Solanum xanti var. glabrescens — (endemic to California) 
Solanum xanti var. hoffmannii — Hoffmann's nightshade (endemic to California) 
Solanum xanti var. intermedium — (endemic to California) 
Solanum xanti var. montanum 
Solanum xanti var. obispoense — San Luis Obispo nightshade (endemic to California) 
Solanum xanti var. xanti

Cultivation
The plant is cultivated as an ornamental plant by specialty plant nurseries for planting in perennial border, drought-tolerant and native plant gardens. It grows from sunny locations to dry shade, such as under native oaks.

The plant is deer resistant, due to its toxic qualities.
In common with many other members in the Solanaceace family, all parts of the plant are toxic, especially the unripe fruit. Toxicity is from Solanine and glycol-alkaloids, chaconine, and solasodine. There is no antidote for Solanum poisoning. Symptoms include:
 Cardiovascular system (tachycardia, arrhythmia, and hypotension)
 Central nervous system (delirium, psychomotor, agitation, paralysis, coma, and convulsion)
 Gastrointestinal track (nausea, vomiting, diarrhea)

Selections
Cultivars and varieties available include:
Solanum xanti var. hoffmannii — Hoffmann's nightshade (long bloom period) 
Solanum xanti 'Mountain Pride' — Mountain Pride purple nightshade (large dark purple flowers)

See also
List of California native plants
California chaparral and woodlands

References

External links

Jepson Manual Treatment: Solanum xanti
Solanum xanti — U.C. Photo gallery

xanti
Flora of Arizona
Flora of Baja California
Flora of California
Flora of Nevada
Flora of Oregon
Flora of the Sierra Nevada (United States)
Natural history of the California chaparral and woodlands
Natural history of the California Coast Ranges
Natural history of the Channel Islands of California
Natural history of the Transverse Ranges
Garden plants of North America
Drought-tolerant plants
Flora without expected TNC conservation status